Circlet Lake is a lake located on Vancouver Island on Forbidden Plateau at the head of Goss Creek. It is located in Strathcona Provincial Park and is a popular location for backcountry camping, hiking, and swimming, and is often used as an overnight stop by hikers summiting Mount Albert Edward.

References

Alberni Valley
Lakes of Vancouver Island
Comox Land District